Rapolas Ivanauskas (born February 15, 1998) is a Lithuanian professional basketball player for ERA Nymburk of the National Basketball League. He played college basketball for the Northwestern Wildcats, the Colgate Raiders, and the Cincinnati Bearcats.

College career
As a sophomore at Colgate, Ivanauskas averaged 15.9 points, 7.8 rebounds and 1.6 assists per game and made 43 3-pointers. He was named the Patriot League Player of the Year for the 2018–19 season. As a junior, Ivanauskas was named to the Second Team All-Patriot League. Ivanauskas averaged 13.1 points and 7.6 rebounds per game for the Colgate Raiders. Following the season, he decided to transfer to Cincinnati for his final season of eligibility. In December 2020, Ivanauskas opted out of playing the remainder of the 2020–21 season at Cincinnati. He had played in seven games and recorded a team-high 31 defensive rebounds during that span.

Professional career
On January 25, 2021, he announced that he had signed with Rytas Vilnius, a professional club in his home country of Lithuania. Ivanauskas averaged 3.0 points and 1.7 rebounds per game. On August 18, 2021, he signed with BC CBet Prienai.

On August 5, 2022, he signed with ERA Nymburk in the Czech Republic..

Career statistics

College

|-
| style="text-align:left;"| 2016–17
| style="text-align:left;"| Northwestern
| style="text-align:center;" colspan="11"|  Redshirt
|-
| style="text-align:left;"| 2017–18
| style="text-align:left;"| Northwestern
| 3 || 0 || 3.7 || .000 || – || – || 1.0 || .0 || .0 || .0 || .0
|-
| style="text-align:left;"| 2018–19
| style="text-align:left;"| Colgate
| 35 || 35 || 30.2 || .518 || .434 || .777 || 7.8 || 1.6 || .5 || .6 || 15.9
|-
| style="text-align:left;"| 2019–20
| style="text-align:left;"| Colgate
| 34 || 34 || 29.1 || .432 || .263 || .602 || 7.6 || 2.1 || .6 || .5 || 13.1
|-
| style="text-align:left;"| 2020–21
| style="text-align:left;"| Cincinnati
| 7 || 3 || 21.4 || .474 || .235 || .667 || 5.0 || .3 || .7 || .0 || 6.3
|- class="sortbottom"
| style="text-align:center;" colspan="2"| Career
| 79 || 72 || 27.9 || .473 || .333 || .701 || 7.2 || 1.6 || .6 || .5 || 13.3

References

External links
Cincinnati Bearcats bio
Colgate Raiders bio
Northwestern Wildcats bio

1998 births
Living people
Basketball players from Kaunas
BC Prienai players
BC Rytas players
Cincinnati Bearcats men's basketball players
Colgate Raiders men's basketball players
Lithuanian expatriate basketball people in the United States
Lithuanian men's basketball players
Northwestern Wildcats men's basketball players
Power forwards (basketball)